The Israel national American football team is the official American football senior national team of Israel. The team formed in 2012, mainly with Israeli Football League players and coaching staff.

First game 
The first international American football game played by Israel was played on 17 May 2012 in Baptist village near Petah Tikva, when the Israeli national team met Maranatha Baptist Bible College. For Israeli players it was the first-ever game on a 100-yard field in an 11 player team. In the IFL, American football is played on 60-yard fields by 9 player teams (in 2012, the IFL played with 8 player teams). The game finished with a 49 - 6 Maranatha win.

Current playing squad

European Championship of American football

2018 European Championship
The first official game in EFAF competitions took place on 30 August 2015 in Madrid. The opponents were Spain from EFAF C Group European Championship. As a new entrant, Israel could earn its way into Group B. Israel won the game 28–20.

Israel then played in the four-team Group B European Championship in Italy in September 2016 with the winner of the four-team tournament eligible for another qualifying round against either Denmark or Sweden, the sixth and fifth place of the 2014 championship respectively, to the A Championship, then planned to be held in Germany in 2018.

The Israel delegation of 45 players and 18 coaches was the largest ever Israeli delegation sent international for a single sport competition.

See also
 American football in Israel
 Israeli Football League

References

Israel
American football in Israel
American Football
2012 establishments in Israel
American football teams established in 2012
National sports teams established in 2012